Gandhabanik is a Bengali Hindu trading caste, who as the caste name suggests, traditionally used to trade in perfumes, cosmetics, spices etc. They were also  engaged in agriculture. As of late nineteenth century they were one of the fourteen castes belonging to Nabasakh group. There is almost one hundred percent literacy among the present gandhabanik generation.

It is believed that the legendary sea merchant Chand Sadagar of ancient Champaknagar was from Gandhabanik community.

Varna Status 
Gandhabaniks have generally been considered as 'middle class shudras' in the caste structure of Bengal.

References 

Bengali Hindu castes
Social groups of West Bengal
Indian castes